John Hardin High School is a school located in Radcliff, Kentucky, but served by the post office of neighboring Elizabethtown. Established in 2001, the school is named after the Revolutionary War officer and Native American fighter, John Hardin.

Bill Clinton visit
Former US President Bill Clinton visited John Hardin High School on May 19, 2008 to campaign for his wife, US Senator Hillary Clinton, in the 2008 presidential Democratic primary campaign. He met John Hardin Principal Alvin Garrison and other members of the staff, and valedictorian, Will Chadwick, before delivering his speech. The event was open to the public.

References

External links
Official school site
Hardin County Schools Performing Arts Center
Bill Clinton visits JHHS
Teens hit, killed by car being pursued

Educational institutions established in 2001
Schools in Hardin County, Kentucky
Public high schools in Kentucky
2001 establishments in Kentucky